France participated at the 2010 Winter Olympics in Vancouver, British Columbia, Canada.

Medalists

Alpine skiing

France qualified 22 skiers, most of any nation at the Games.

Men

Women

Biathlon

Men

Women

Cross-country skiing

Men

Women

Curling

Men's tournament 

Men's team
Thomas Dufour
Tony Angiboust
Jan Ducroz
Richard Ducroz
Raphael Mathieu

Standings

Figure skating

Freestyle skiing

Moguls

Ski cross

Luge

Nordic combined

Short track speed skating

Men

Women

Skeleton

Men

Ski jumping

Men

Snowboarding

Déborah Anthonioz
Mathieu Bozzetto
Mathieu Crepel
Paul-Henri de Le Rue
Camile De Foucompre
Xavier de Le Rue
Natalie Desmares
Sylvain Dufour
Nelly Moenne Loccoz
Tony Ramoin
Claire Chapotot
Pierre Vaultier

Halfpipe

Speed skating

Men

See also
 France at the 2010 Winter Paralympics

References

2010 in French sport
Nations at the 2010 Winter Olympics
2010